The Union County Courthouse  is a courthouse in El Dorado, Arkansas, United States, the county seat of Union County, built in 1927. It was listed on the National Register of Historic Places in 1983. The courthouse was built in the Classic Revival and Greek Revival styles by Mann & Stern and anchors the center of Union Square.

History
Union County was established in 1829 from Hempstead County and Clark County. The county seat began at Ecore Fabre and was moved to Scarborough's Landing. Cotton farmers again requested the county seat to move in 1843. It was moved to the county's highest point and was platted as El Dorado.

Architecture

The four-story courthouse has an entirely smooth limestone exterior with 40 freestanding ionic columns. Scales of justice and lanterns adorn the exterior. Inside the courthouse is a two-story marble art deco atrium of marble and a courtroom with walnut wainscoting, a plaster ceiling featuring gilded rosettes and walls textured to resemble stone.

See also
 List of county courthouses in Arkansas
 National Register of Historic Places listings in Union County, Arkansas

References

Neoclassical architecture in Arkansas
Government buildings completed in 1927
Buildings and structures in El Dorado, Arkansas
County courthouses in Arkansas
Courthouses on the National Register of Historic Places in Arkansas
Individually listed contributing properties to historic districts on the National Register in Arkansas
National Register of Historic Places in Union County, Arkansas
1927 establishments in Arkansas
Greek Revival architecture in Arkansas